The 1999–2000 North Dakota Fighting Sioux men's ice hockey season was the 58th season of play for the program. They represent the University of North Dakota in the 1999–2000 NCAA Division I men's ice hockey season and for the 49th season in the Western Collegiate Hockey Association (WCHA). The Fighting Sioux were coached by Dean Blais, in his 6th season, and played their home games at Ralph Engelstad Arena.

Season
After getting knocked out in the first round of the NCAA Tournament in back-to-back years, North Dakota was chomping at the bit for another chance to prove themselves. Led by Peter Armbrust, Lee Goren and Jason Ulmer, three seniors who had won a national championship as freshmen, the Fighting Sioux entered the season as one of the favorites to compete for a championship.

Early success
Relying heavily on junior netminder, Karl Goehring, the team began their season with an almost flawless start. After taking three out of four points on the road from long-time rival Minnesota, North Dakota travelled east and swept #7 Clarkson. While they got a fight in the second game, the win established the Sioux early on and they rose up to #1 in the polls in early-November.

Goaltending battle
Goehring didn't drop a match until his 10th game of the season. While backup netminder Andy Kollar started the following game, that was due mostly to the weakness of the opposition. Goehring was back in net the very next contest but allowed 6 goals for the second consecutive game. Kollar was put in goal for the next four games and while his numbers weren't spectacular, UND won three of the matches. However, Kollar lost the starting job after a poor performance against Denver, one of the weaker teams in the conference. The two would continue to share the goal crease for the remainder of the season, though Goehring did retain the lion's share of the starts.

Ups and downs
After the loss to Denver, North Dakota flirted with the #1 ranking after winning the Badger Showdown. A couple of weeks later, however, Wisconsin got its revenge by sweeping the Fighting Sioux and establishing themselves atop the conference standings. UND could little afford to lose any of its remaining games if it wanted to continue as the regular season WCHA champion. A split with Minnesota the very next weekend put them in a precarious position while a near sweep at the hands of St. Cloud State all but ended their chances at a 4th-consecutive conference championship.

Finishing strong
North Dakota righted the ship in February and rounded out the final four weeks of the regular season without a loss. In the team's 5–0 win over Michigan Tech, Karl Goehring set a new program record with his 5th shutout of the season. When the team entered the postseason, he had pushed the mark up to 6 and was one of the top goaltenders in the nation. Both he and Jeff Panzer were named as First Team All-Americans and UND entered the conference playoffs as the #2 team in the nation.

WCHA tournament
North Dakota began their postseason run at home against Denver and, though their offense faltered in the second game, the Fighting Sioux were too much for the Pioneers to handle. Before the next round began, however, Goehring was diagnosed with a concussion and the team had to rely on Andy Kollar to take them the rest of the way. The sophomore held the fort and allowed North Dakota's offense to carry the team to victory, including a win over top-ranked Wisconsin in the WCHA championship game.

NCAA tournament
North Dakota moved up to #2 in the polls but still remained behind Wisconsin. While that left the team as the #2 western seed, it did provide UND with a buy into the second round of the tournament. While Goehring was still sidelined, North Dakota received a gift when the lowest-seeded team, Niagara, pulled off an upset in the first round. UND dominated in the first and third periods to end their postseason losing streak and propel themselves into the Frozen Four.

Despite Kollar's performance in Goehring's absence, as soon as their primary starter was cleared to play, head coach Dean Blais put Goehring back in net. Any worries about the move were banished in the national semifinal when Goehring earned his 8th shutout of the season, defeating defending champion Maine in the process. The win sent UND to the championship game with just Boston College remaining in their way. The two teams were evenly matched in the first period, with both scoring 1 goal on 13 shots. BC got a lead in the second period but afterwards the team started playing a more defensive style. Lee Goren tied the game early in the third period and both teams struggled to find chances thereafter. with less than 6 minutes left in regulation, Goren assisted on Jason Ulmer's go-ahead marker and then potted an empty net goal to seal the match and give North Dakota its seventh national championship.

Departures

Recruiting

Roster

Standings

Schedule and results

|-
!colspan=12 style=";" | Exhibition

|-
!colspan=12 style=";" | Regular Season

|-
!colspan=11 style=";" | 

|-
!colspan=11 style=";" | 

|-
!colspan=11 style=";" | 

|- align="center" bgcolor="#e0e0e0"
|colspan=11|North Dakota Won Series 2-1

|-
!colspan=11 style=";" |

2000 national championship

Scoring statistics

Goaltending statistics

Rankings

USCHO did not release a poll in week 23.

Awards and honors

Players drafted into the NHL

2000 NHL Entry Draft

† incoming freshman

References

North Dakota Fighting Hawks men's ice hockey seasons
North Dakota
North Dakota
North Dakota
North Dakota
North Dakota
North Dakota